Moldova 1 is the national Moldovan television channel, operated by the national public broadcaster, Teleradio-Moldova.

History 
Moldova 1 was launched on 30 April 1958, at 7:00 pm.

Directors  

 Andrei Timuș (February 1958 – April 1961) 
 Mihail Onoicenco (July 1961 – March 1966) 
 Ion Podoleanu (March 1966 – March 1968) 
 Valentin Șleagun (May 1968 – September 1974) 
 Ion Busuioc (August 1975 – December 1988) 
 Mihail Strașan (March 1989 – January 1990)
 Constantin Pârțac (January 1990 – April 1994)
 Dumitru Țurcanu (April 1994 – November 1997)
 Iurie Tăbârță (November 1997 – July 1999)
 Arcadie Gherasim (July 1999 – June 2000)
 Anatol Barbei (June 2000 – September 2001)
 Iurie Tăbârță (September 2001 – June 2002)
 Alexandru Grosu (June 2002 – August 2003)
 Sergiu Prodan (August 2003 – October 2003)
 Victor Moraru (January 2004 – April 2004)
 Victor Tăbârță (April 2004 – December 2004)
 Adela Răilean (December 2004 – December 2009) 
 Angela Sârbu (February 2010 - February 2012)
 Mircea Surdu (December 2012 – June 2017)

Current Team Management  
 Leonid Melnic (General Producer)
 Vitalie Cojocaru (marketing director)
 Alexandru Gutu (Technical Director)

Logos

See also 
Union of Journalists of Moldova

References

External links 
Moldova 1 official site

Television channels in Moldova
Television channels and stations established in 1958
Teleradio-Moldova
Mass media in Chișinău
1958 establishments in the Soviet Union